A Cry in the Night may refer to:

A Cry in the Night (novel), by Mary Higgins Clark
"A Cry in the Night" (song), a 1989 song by Bonnie Bianco
A Cry in the Night (1956 film), a 1956 film noir starring Edmond O'Brien, Brian Donlevy and Natalie Wood
A Cry in the Night (1996 film), a 1996 film directed by Jean Beaudry